Giant Squid is an American independent video game development company located in Santa Monica, California. Founded by several ex-thatgamecompany staff in March 2013, the studio is most known for developing Abzû (2016) and The Pathless (2020).

History
Giant Squid was founded in 2013 by Matt Nava, who previously worked at thatgamecompany as the art director for Flower (2009) and Journey (2012).  Nava was joined by lead designer Nicholas Clark, and the composer for Journey, Austin Wintory. TV and film production company The Ink Factory also helped co-found the company, and was involved in providing funding for the studio's projects. The studio is located in Santa Monica, California.

At E3 2014, the company announced sea exploration game Abzû as their debut title. Development lasted three years, and the team partnered with publisher 505 Games to release the game in August 2016. The game received generally positive reviews upon release, with critics praising the game's visual style and music. The studio's next project was The Pathless, which was released by publisher Annapurna Interactive in November 2020.

Games

References

External links
 

Companies based in Santa Monica, California
Video game development companies
2013 establishments in California
Video game companies based in California
Video game companies established in 2013
Indie video game developers